Geoffrey D. Dabelko is Professor and Associate Dean at the George V. Voinovich School of Leadership and Public Service at Ohio University in Athens, OH. He teaches and conducts applied research in the School's Environmental Studies Program and Master's in Sustainability, Security, and Resilience. His recent research focuses on the conflict and cooperation potential of responses to climate change, environmental peacebuilding, and sustainability, climate resilience, and older adults.

Early life and education 
Dabelko grew up in Athens, Ohio, graduating from Athens High School. He has an AB in political science from Duke University and a Ph.D. in government and politics from the University of Maryland.

Career 
From 1997-2012, Dabelko served as director of the Environmental Change and Security Program (ECSP) at the Woodrow Wilson International Center for Scholars in Washington, D.C.  He continues to work as a senior advisor to the Wilson Center. He is also an Associate Senior Fellow with the Stockholm International Peace Research Institute on its Environment of Peace Initiative. From 2012-2018, he served as director of Ohio University's Environmental Studies Program. He has held previous positions at the Carnegie Endowment for International Peace's Foreign Policy and the Council on Foreign Relations. 

Dabelko is a member of the United Nations Environment Programme’s Expert Advisory Group on Environment, Conflict, and Peacebuilding. He is a board member at Population Reference Bureau and a founding board member of the Environmental Peacebuilding Association. He is an editorial board member of the journal Case Studies in the Environment, published through University of California Press. Dabelko was a lead author on the 5th Assessment of the Intergovernmental Panel on Climate Change, Working Group II Chapter 12 on "Human Security." He is a chapter author on the 5th U.S. National Climate Assessment.

Research 
Dabelko is known for his research in and work on environmental peacebuilding. He is co-editor, with Ken Conca of American University, of Green Planet Blues: Critical Perspectives on Global Environmental Politics and Environmental Peacemaking. Dabelko and Conca were the co-recipients of the Fifth Al-Moumin Award and Distinguished Lecture on Environmental Peacebuilding in 2018 for their work on environmental peacebuilding. Erik Solheim, Executive Director of the United Nations Environment Programme remarked, “No two individuals have shaped our institutional thinking on environmental peacebuilding more than Geoff Dabelko and Ken Conca."

Personal life 
Dabelko lives in Athens, OH.

Publications

References 

American environmentalists
Duke University Trinity College of Arts and Sciences alumni
Governmental studies academics
International relations scholars
People from Greenbelt, Maryland
Living people
Year of birth missing (living people)